Lerista christinae, also known commonly as the bold-striped slider and Christina's lerista,  is a species of skink, a lizard in the family Scincidae. The species is endemic to the Australian state of Western Australia.

Etymology
The specific name, christinae, is in honor of Australian biologist Christine Davidge.

Habitat
The preferred natural habitat of L. christinae is shrubland.

Description
L. christinae has four digits on each front foot, and four digits on each hind foot.

Reproduction
L. christinae is oviparous.

References

Further reading
Cogger HG (2013). Reptiles and Amphibians of Australia, Seventh Edition. Clayton, Victoria, Australia: CSIRO Publishing. xxx + 1,033 pp. .
Storr GM (1979). "Five new lizards from Western Australia". Records of the Western Australian Museum 8 (1): 134–142. (Lerista christinae, new species, pp. 139–140, Plate 3).
Wilson S, Swan G (2013). A Complete Guide to Reptile of Australia, Fourth Edition. Sydney: New Holland Publishers. 522 pp. .

Lerista
Reptiles described in 1979
Taxa named by Glen Milton Storr